Matthew Davidson is an American singer-songwriter.

Matthew Davidson or Matt Davidson may also refer to:
 Matt Davidson (baseball) (born 1991), American baseball third baseman
 Matt Davidson (ice hockey) (born 1977), former National Hockey League right wing
 Mat Davidson (1869–1949), Australian politician
 Mathew Davison (1839–1918), American politician
 Matthew Wolfe Davidson, United States Air Force brigadier general and former vice commander of the Space Operations Command